Bifrost is a role-playing game published by Skytrex Ltd. (U.K) in four volumes from 1977 to 1982.

Description
Bifrost is a fantasy system, fairly complex and derivative of miniatures. The rules cover character creation, combat (melee, mounted, and aerial), magic, demonology, prayer and divine intervention, disease and illness, travel to other planes, etc.

Publication history
Bifrost was designed by K. White, K. Minear, S. Johnson, and G. Highley, and published by Skytrex Ltd. Its first volume Faerie came out in 1977, covering character creation and background rules. The game wasn't playable, though, without at least the second volume Combat from 1978, which would describe skill use and especially combat; and if players wanted to use magic the third volume Magic, whose publishing year is not known due to a missing copyright notice. A fourth volume from 1982 would later provide additional rules and amendments to existing ones.

Reception
Don Turnbull reviewed Faerie, volume 1 of Bifrost, for White Dwarf #7 (June/July 1978). Turnbull noted that the game cannot be played without all three volumes, "a marked disadvantage if the three volumes are not all published at the same time". He felt that the presentation was good, but noted that "such care in presentation was not matched by care in proof-reading - indeed it is easy to believe that there was no proof-reading at all. There are many printer's errors in the text [...] there are too many to list here". He considered the first volume "an impressive production" and concluded that it was a "promising start but the publishers should perhaps have had more confidence in their authors and should have been less slaphappy in the production - there is no excuse at all for such obvious errors".

Lewis Pulsipher reviewed Bifrost in The Space Gamer No. 57. Pulsipher commented that "Few readers of Bifrost will decide to convert to it from their current FRPG, nor is it for novices. But there are many aspects which can be adapted to cover holes in other FRPGs. It must be virtually impossible to buy Bifrost in the USA, nor can I recommend mail order to Britain. But if you do run across it in a shop, take a look."

References

British role-playing games
Fantasy role-playing games
Role-playing games introduced in 1982